59P/Kearns–Kwee is a periodic comet in the Solar System with a current orbital period of 9.52 years.

It was discovered by E. Kearns and Kiem King Kwee on a photographic plate taken on 17 August 1963 during a search for the lost comet 55P/Tempel–Tuttle and confirmed by Elizabeth Roemer at the US Naval Observatory Flagstaff Station, Arizona. She estimated its brightness at a faint magnitude of 16. The perihelion was initially calculated as 28 October 1963 and the periodicity as 8.48 years, but calculations based on further observations revised the data to 7 December and 8.95 years.

The 1972 apparition was observed by Elizabeth Roemer and L. M. Vaughn of the University of Arizona, using the 229-cm reflector at Kitt Peak as early as 26 July 1971. It was relocated in 1981 by T. Seki of Japan and again on 10 September 1989 by J. Gibson at Palomar Observatory. It was also successfully re-observed in 1999 and 2009.

See also
 List of numbered comets

References

Periodic comets
0059
19630817